Biniam Girmay Hailu (born 2 April 2000) is a professional Eritrean  road cyclist who currently rides for UCI WorldTeam .

At the 2022 Giro d'Italia, he became the first Black African cyclist to win a Grand Tour stage after winning stage 10 in a reduced bunch sprint.

Career
After discovering cycling through his cousin Meron Teshome, Girmay joined the World Cycling Centre in 2018 for his second junior year. That year, he became a triple junior cycling champion of Africa, winning the road race, time trial and team time trial. He also won the first stage of Aubel–Thimister–Stavelot, beating out favorite Remco Evenepoel.

In 2019, with the Eritrea national team, he won the third stage in a sprint of the La Tropicale Amissa Bongo, his first professional victory. This made Girmay the first cyclist born in the 2000s to win a professional race. His success continued, winning stage 5 of the Tour of Rwanda in a sprint against experienced riders, including Joseph Areruya and Daniel Turek who finished 2nd and 3rd.

For the 2020 season, Girmay joined UCI ProTeam , with whom he notably finished second in the Trofeo Laigueglia and the Tour du Doubs.

After he was let go by  earlier in the year,  announced his signing on 6 August 2021. He made his debut for his new team days later at the 2021 Tour de Pologne.

On 24 September 2021, he finished second in the under-23 road race at the UCI Road World Championships, becoming the first black African rider to achieve a podium finish in the history of the UCI Road World Championships.

On 27 March 2022, in Gent–Wevelgem, Girmay was part of the winning breakaway, which also included Christophe Laporte, Jasper Stuyven, and Dries Van Gestel. In the finale, he was the first to launch his sprint, coming from the back of the group, and held on for the victory. In doing so, he became the first African winner of a classic cycle race.

Later that season, Girmay rode his first Grand Tour at the Giro d'Italia. On stage 1, he finished second to Mathieu van der Poel in an uphill sprint. Towards the next eight stages, he amassed four top five finishes in bunch sprints as well as a breakaway stage. On stage 10, in a reduced bunch sprint, he outsprinted van der Poel in a long sprint to win his first Grand Tour stage. He made history as he became the first Black African cyclist to win a stage at a Grand Tour. However, at the podium, as Girmay was opening the bottle of Prosecco, the wine cork hit his left eye at full speed. He was checked by race and team doctors before being sent to the hospital for treatment. The following day, Girmay confirmed that he would abandon the Giro in order to let his eye injury fully heal.

Major results

2018
 African Junior Road Championships
1st  Road race
1st  Time trial
1st  Team time trial
 2nd Overall Grand Prix Rüebliland
 3rd Overall Aubel–Thimister–Stavelot
1st Stage 1
 3rd Trofeo Comune di Vertova
 4th Trofeo Emilio Paganessi
2019
 1st Stage 3 La Tropicale Amissa Bongo
 1st Stage 5 Tour du Rwanda
2020
 La Tropicale Amissa Bongo
1st  Points classification
1st Stages 3 & 6
 2nd Trofeo Laigueglia
 2nd Tour du Doubs
 4th Giro della Toscana
2021
 1st Classic Grand Besançon Doubs
 2nd  Road race, UCI Road World Under-23 Championships
 2nd Tour du Doubs
 5th Gran Piemonte
 5th Route Adélie
 6th La Roue Tourangelle
 7th Royal Bernard Drôme Classic
 7th Druivenkoers Overijse
 7th Tour du Jura
 9th Trofeo Laigueglia
2022
 1st  Time trial, National Road Championships
 1st Gent–Wevelgem
 1st Trofeo Alcúdia–Port d'Alcúdia
 Giro d'Italia
1st Stage 10
Held  after Stage 1
 2nd Grand Prix de Wallonie
 3rd Grand Prix Cycliste de Québec
 4th Tour du Doubs
 5th E3 Saxo Bank Classic
 6th Bretagne Classic
 7th La Drôme Classic
 10th Milano–Torino
2023
 1st Stage 1 Volta a la Comunitat Valenciana
 2nd Trofeo Palma
 3rd Trofeo Ses Salines–Alcúdia

Grand Tour general classification results timeline

Classics results timeline

References

External links

2000 births
Cyclists at the 2018 Summer Youth Olympics
Eritrean Giro d'Italia stage winners
Eritrean male cyclists
Living people
Sportspeople from Asmara